Roberto Bautista-Agut was the defending champion but decided not to participate.
Julian Reister defeated Guillermo García-López 4–6, 6–3, 6–2 in the final to win the title.

Seeds

Draw

Finals

Top half

Bottom half

References
 Main Draw
 Qualifying Draw

Rai Open - Singles
2013 Singles